Xeneretmus is a genus of poachers native to the eastern Pacific Ocean.

Species
There are currently four recognized species in this genus:
 Xeneretmus latifrons (C. H. Gilbert, 1890) (Blacktip poacher)
 Xeneretmus leiops C. H. Gilbert, 1915 (Smooth-eye poacher)
 Xeneretmus ritteri C. H. Gilbert, 1915 (Stripefin poacher)
 Xeneretmus triacanthus (C. H. Gilbert, 1890) (Blue-spotted poacher)

References

External links

 
Bathyagoninae